The Last Race may refer to:

 The Last Race (1954 film), an Italian drama film
 The Last Race (2022 film), a Czech historical sport drama film
 On Wings of Eagles (film), also titled The Last Race, a 2016 Chinese-Hong Kong-American historical sports drama film